Muhammad Rauf Pasha (c.1832 – 1888) was an Egyptian soldier and colonial administrator who served in turn as governor of Equatoria and Harar, and governor general of Sudan.

Early career

He rose in the army, accepting posts in a difficult region that most Egyptian officers did their best to avoid but which he saw as presenting opportunity.
Rauf Pasha became a general in the Egyptian army.
He had considerable experience in Sudan, but was considered mediocre by the British.
One historian said dryly that he was envied "for his skill at baccarat".

While a young officer Rauf Bey was chief of staff to Samuel Baker in Equatoria.
On 23 January 1872 Baker left Rauf Bey with 340 men to garrison Ismailia while he undertook an expedition to the far south of Equatoria.
When Baker returned on 1 April 1873 the station seemed neglected, although the gardens had been looked after well.
Rauf Bey had proved capable, and had led an attack on the Belinian Bari to recover some deserters.
Rauf was appointed governor of Equatoria in August 1873, succeeding Samuel Baker Pasha, and was succeeded by Charles George Gordon in March 1874.
Gordon wrote to Baker of 1 October 1875, "Rauf Pasha (when at Ismailia) let all discipline go to the dogs; and I do not wonder at it: for unpaid and uncared-for soldiers will never be amenable to discipline..."

In 1875 Muhammad Rauf Pasha led an Egyptian force from Zeila into the interior of southeast Ethiopia, pretending to be a scientific expedition.
It occupied Harar on 11 October 1875.
The emir was murdered and the Oromo representatives summoned by Rauf Pasha were massacred.
Rauf Pasha campaigned in the countryside around Harar in February and March 1876 and suppressed all attempts at rebellion.
He took forcible measures to ensure that fallow land was planted with grain or coffee.
He levied tax on crops and livestock in order to encourage settlement and further cultivation.
On 15 April 1878 Gordon wrote to Baek, "Rauf Pasha is at Harar, out of which I mean to turn him, when I get up there."
Rauf Pasha was replaced by Ridhwan Pasha, who was governor from 1878 to June 1880.

Sudan

After Gordon resigned in 1880, Muhammad Rauf Pasha succeeded him as governor general of Sudan.
He made inefficient efforts to calm down the population, whom Gordon had pushed close to rebellion, and to reduce the size of the garrisons in the Sudan, following orders from Riaz Pasha.
When Rudolf Carl von Slatin arrived in Khartoum in January 1881 Rauf Pasha appointed him general governor of Darfur in place of Massedaglia.
In 1881 he appointed Frank Lupton governor of the Bahr el Ghazal in place of Gessi Pasha.

The first reaction of Rauf Pasha to the 29 June 1881 declaration by Muhammad Ahmad that he was the Mahdi was that Ahmad would be satisfied with a government pension, and he sent him a friendly letter.
Ahmad telegraphed an uncompromising reply saying "He who does not believe in me will be purified by the sword." Rauf Pasha sent a small party to arrest the Mahdi, but on 11 August 1881 it was overwhelmed, and the insurrection on the southern Sudan began to grow. Rauf Pasha downplayed the "affray" in his report to Cairo, and sent the governor of Kordofan to Aba Island with 1,000 soldiers to crush the Mahdi. When they arrived they found the Mahdi had fled to the southwest. The soldiers marched after him, but gave up the pursuit when the September rains flooded the roads and riverbeds and returned to El-Obeid. The Mahdi established a new base in the Nuba Mountains.

On 9 September 1881 Lt. Col. Ahmad Arabi invested the khedivial palace and became de facto ruler of Egypt.
Rauf Pasha found himself adrift without money and orders.
The Sudanese conscripts he had dismissed as ordered by Riaz Pasha were going over to the Mahdi, while his Egyptian officers were hoping that with the change of government they could get softer jobs in northern Egypt.

In December 1888 Governor Rashid Ayman at Fashoda led 400 soldiers and a mob of friendly Shilluk tribesmen to attack the Mahdi at Jebel Gadir,  to the southwest.
The Mahdi was forewarned and prepared.
The two forces clashed in the early morning of 8 December 1881 and the Egyptians were decisively beaten.
Rashid Ayman was killed and beheaded.
A legend spread rapidly that the Mahdist troops armed with sticks and spears had triumphed over government rifles.
Rauf Pasha stated that he had not been aware or involved in the incident.
He asked the Khedive Tewfik Pasha for reinforcements, but Tewfik had no loyal troops to spare.

Ahmad Arabi was inclined to cooperate with the Mahdi.
In February 1882 the Arabi government appointed Abdel Qadir Pasha Hilmi as successor of Rauf Pasha, and instructed him not to recognize the khedive.
Carl Christian Giegler Pasha took office as acting governor general on 4 March 1882.
His replacement Fariq Abdel Qadir Pasha Hilmi arrived in Khartoum on 11 May 1882.

Notes

Citations

Sources

1832 births
1888 deaths
Egyptian civil servants
Egyptian pashas